BiosGroup is a Santa Fe, New Mexico-based for-profit company founded in 1997 by Stuart Kauffman and Ernst & Young (now Capgemini Ernst and Young) which aimed to commercialize complexity science software in applications that helped companies manage projects and supply chains. BiosGroup was a spin-off from the Santa Fe Institute. Its clients included Southwest Airlines, P&G, Ford, Boeing, SAP AG and Texas Instruments; as well as government agencies like the Office of Naval Research and the Internal Revenue Service. In 2000, it received investments of $5 million from Procter & Gamble and $8 million from Ford Motor Company.

At its peak, BiosGroup employed about 150 people in offices in  Santa Fe, Boston, London, Bulgaria, and Washington, DC. BiosGroup spun off several prospering companies including: eXchange Advantage; Qforma (previously Commodicast); Icosystem; Genpathway (previously CIStem); and EuroBios SA.

BiosGroup's consulting operations were acquired by NuTech Solutions in 2003.

See also
Roger Jones
Prediction Company
Santa Fe Institute

References

Dana MacKinzie, "The Science of Surprise," Discover Magazine, Vol. 23, No. 2, 59-63 (February 2002)

External links
EuroBios SA 
Genpathway
Icosystem
NuTech Solutions

Companies based in Santa Fe, New Mexico